James H. Diamond (April 22, 1925 – May 14, 1945) was a United States Army soldier and a recipient of the United States military's highest decoration—the Medal of Honor—for his actions in World War II.

Biography
Diamond joined the Army from Gulfport, Mississippi in September 1943, and by May 8, 1945, was serving as a private first class in Company D, 21st Infantry Regiment, 24th Infantry Division. On that day and the following six days, at Mintal, Mindanao, the Philippines, he repeatedly distinguished himself by his actions in battle and by volunteering for hazardous assignments, such as evacuating wounded and repairing a bridge under heavy fire. On May 14, he was killed after running through intense hostile fire to reach an abandoned machine gun during a mission to evacuate wounded soldiers. For these actions, he was posthumously awarded the Medal of Honor ten months later, on March 6, 1946.

Diamond, aged 20 at his death, was buried in Evergreen Cemetery, Gulfport, Mississippi.

Medal of Honor citation
Private First Class Diamond's official Medal of Honor citation reads:
As a member of the machinegun section, he displayed extreme gallantry and intrepidity above and beyond the call of duty . When a Japanese sniper rose from his foxhole to throw a grenade into their midst, this valiant soldier charged and killed the enemy with a burst from his submachine gun; then, by delivering sustained fire from his personal arm and simultaneously directing the fire of 105mm. and .50 caliber weapons upon the enemy pillboxes immobilizing this and another machinegun section, he enabled them to put their guns into action. When 2 infantry companies established a bridgehead, he voluntarily assisted in evacuating the wounded under heavy fire; and then, securing an abandoned vehicle, transported casualties to the rear through mortar and artillery fire so intense as to render the vehicle inoperative and despite the fact he was suffering from a painful wound. The following day he again volunteered, this time for the hazardous job of repairing a bridge under heavy enemy fire. On 14 May 1945, when leading a patrol to evacuate casualties from his battalion, which was cut off, he ran through a virtual hail of Japanese fire to secure an abandoned machine gun. Though mortally wounded as he reached the gun, he succeeded in drawing sufficient fire upon himself so that the remaining members of the patrol could reach safety. Pfc. Diamond's indomitable spirit, constant disregard of danger, and eagerness to assist his comrades, will ever remain a symbol of selflessness and heroic sacrifice to those for whom he gave his life.

See also

List of Medal of Honor recipients
List of Medal of Honor recipients for World War II

References

1925 births
1945 deaths
United States Army personnel killed in World War II
United States Army Medal of Honor recipients
People from Gulfport, Mississippi
United States Army soldiers
World War II recipients of the Medal of Honor